Oxyanthus is a genus of plant in family Rubiaceae. It contains the following species (but this list may be incomplete):

 Oxyanthus barensis K. Krause 
 Oxyanthus biflorus J.E. Burrows & S.M. Burrows, 2010  (Endangered)  
 Oxyanthus bremekampii Cavaco 
 Oxyanthus brevicaulis K. Krause 
 Oxyanthus dubius De Wild. 
 Oxyanthus formosus Hook. f. ex Planch. 
 Oxyanthus goetzei K. Schum. 
 Oxyanthus gracilis Hiern 
 Oxyanthus haerdii Bridson 
 Oxyanthus latifolius Sond. 
 Oxyanthus laxiflorus K. Schum. ex Hutch. & Dalziel 
 Oxyanthus ledermannii K. Krause 
 Oxyanthus lepidus S. Moore 
 Oxyanthus letouzeyanus Sonké 
 Oxyanthus mayumbensis R.D. Good 
 Oxyanthus montanus Sonké 
 Oxyanthus nangensis K. Krause 
 Oxyanthus okuensis Cheek & Sonké, 2000  (Critically Endangered) 
 Oxyanthus oliganthus K. Schum. 
 Oxyanthus pallidus Hiern 
 Oxyanthus pulcher K. Schum. 
 Oxyanthus pyriformis (Hochst.) Skeels 
 Oxyanthus querimbensis Klotzsch 
 Oxyanthus racemosus (Schumach. & Thonn.) Keay 
 Oxyanthus robbrechtianus Sonké, 1994 
 Oxyanthus schumannianus De Wild. & T. Durand 
 Oxyanthus setosus Keay 
 Oxyanthus smithii Hiern 
 Oxyanthus speciosus DC. 
 Oxyanthus subpunctatus (Hiern) Keay 
 Oxyanthus troupinii  Bridson 
 Oxyanthus tubiflorus (Andr.) DC. 
 Oxyanthus ugandensis  Bridson 
 Oxyanthus unilocularis  Hiern 
 Oxyanthus zanguebaricus (Hiern) Bridson 

The genus Oxyanthus was first described in 1807 by Augustin Pyramus de Candolle, a Swiss botanist.

References 

 
Rubiaceae genera
Taxonomy articles created by Polbot